Germany plays an important role in the fashion industry, along with France, the United Kingdom, the United States, Italy, Spain, and Japan. German fashion is known for unconventional young designers and manufacturers of sports and outdoor clothing, ready-to-wear and custom-made creations.

Berlin, the country's capital city, is also a fashion capital of the world  and the home of Berlin Fashion Week, the country's main event where young and creative German fashion designers showcase unique creations. Other important cities to the German fashion landscape are Munich, Hamburg and Cologne. Smaller places such as Herford, Metzingen, Herzogenaurach, Schorndorf, Chemnitz, Albstadt and Detmold. are also important design and production hubs of the German fashion industry.

Economy
In around 1,300 companies with more than 130,000 employees, a revenue of 28 billion Euro is generated by the German textile industry. Almost 44 percent of the products are exported. The textile branch thus is the second largest producer of consumer goods in Germany, after food production.

Brands

Famous fashion brands include MCM, Hugo Boss, Adidas, PUMA, Escada, JOOP!, Bruno Banani, Jil Sander, Triumph, Schiesser, Closed, Reusch, Valisere, Jack Wolfskin, Ulla Popken, Buffalo, Rohde, Marc O'Polo, Tom Tailor, s.Oliver, Esprit, Wunderkind, Seidensticker, Windsor., Jaques Britt, Naketano.

There are also various agencies hosting multiple German brands and designers at once, such as zLabels Berlin. Also the big department stores like Kaufhof and Karstadt, retail chains like Peek & Cloppenburg, Ulla Popken and NewYorker or mail order and online shops like Otto and Zalando have various in-house fashion brands.

Fairs
The Bread & Butter in Berlin is a leading trade fair for street fashion and ready-to-wear trends, twice annually during Berlin Fashion Week. The Igedo fair Collection Première Düsseldorf in Düsseldorf (CPD) was the world's dominating fashion fair for years.

Designers

Renowned fashion designers from Germany are e.g. Karl Lagerfeld, Hugo Boss, Wolfgang Joop, Jil Sander, Michael Michalsky, Etienne Aigner, Tomas Maier, Robert Geller, Philipp Plein, Rudolph Moshammer, Torsten Amft, Uli Herzner, Gabriele Strehle, Christoph Tisch, Marc Engelhard, Willy Bogner, Rudolf and Adi Dassler.

Media
Important fashion media of Germany include the German Vogue, Elle, InStyle, Cosmopolitan, Vanity Fair, Jolie, Glamour, Grazia, Life&Style and Sleek magazines. The German fashion magazine with the longest continued tradition is Burda Style, that was first published by Aenne Burda in 1950, who also established the major Bauer Media Group. Also various general women magazines and tabloids like Joy, Brigitte, Petra, Gala and Bunte are influential in regards to fashion perception.

As for television, FashionTV can be received via cable or satellite. Various casting shows reach a large audience in Germany, including Germany's Next Topmodel by Heidi Klum. Also on ProSieben, the series Fashion Hero starring Claudia Schiffer was looking for fashion design talents. The Shopping Queen format at VOX stars designer Guido Maria Kretschmer, it provides five contestants with 500 EUR to buy them a fashion outfit and styling in four hours, to compete with each other.

Agencies
Important modeling agency locations in Germany are Berlin (izaio, CORE Artist Management, Seeds Models, Viva Models, OneEins), Munich (Louisa Models, Most Wanted Models, Munich Models, Nova Models, Talents München, Vivienne Models) and Hamburg ( CORE Artist Management, MGM Models, iconic management, m 4 models, Mega Models, Model Management, Modelwerk, Most Wanted Models, Place Models, PMA Models). Also agencies in Vienna and Zurich host models based in Germany, as well as major global agencies like IMG Models, DNA, Elite, Models 1 and NEXT.

Models

There is a range of fashion models from Germany that made it to international fame, such as Claudia Schiffer, Heidi Klum, Diane Kruger, Eva Padberg, Toni Garrn, Julia Stegner, Tatjana Patitz, Anna Ewers, Manon von Gerkan, Birte Glang, Nico, Uschi Obermaier, Carola Remer, Franziska Knuppe, Vanessa Hegelmaier, Lena Gercke, Sara Nuru, Barbara Meier, Nadja Auermann, Claudia Ciesla, Aslı Bayram, Shermine Shahrivar, Evelyn Sharma, Victoria Jancke, Marten Laciny, Nico Schwanz and Lars Burmeister.

Education
Fashion education in Germany is centered on art schools, universities and the major fashion manufacturers.

Academic institutions that offer courses in fashion design include:
Multiple locations
Berlin, Düsseldorf, Hamburg, Munich: AMD Academy of Fashion and Design
Leipzig, Schwerin: Design Hochschule

Berlin

Berlin University of the Arts
HTW Berlin
Lette-Verein Berlin Fashion and Design School
Weissensee Academy of Arts

Others
Bremen: University of the Arts Bremen
Düsseldorf: Kunstakademie Düsseldorf
Halle: Giebichenstein Castle Academy of Arts
Hamburg: HAW Hamburg
Karlsruhe: Academy of Fine Arts
Munich: Academy of Fine Arts
Nuremberg: Academy of Fine Arts

References
Stern Magazine Style-Extra - Deutsche Mode (German)

External links

Fashion at Creative Germany
German Fashion Institute
German Fashion Association (German)

 
Fashion
Fashion